"Lunatic" is a commonly used term for a person who is mentally ill, dangerous, foolish, unpredictable; a condition once called lunacy.

Lunatic may also refer to:
Lunatic (Booba album), 2010 
Lunatic (Kongos album), 2012/14 
Lunatic (group), a French hip-hop duo, consisted of Ali and Booba
Lunatic (novel), a 2009 novel by Ted Dekker
Lunatic Lake, in Alaska, U.S.
The Cornell Lunatic, a college humor magazine at Cornell University
"Lunatic", a single by Gazebo
"Lunatic", a song by Dolores O'Riordan from No Baggage
"Lunatic", a song by Static-X from Cult of Static
Lunatics (painting), a painting by Odd Nerdrum
Lunatics (TV series), a 2019 Australian web television series starring Chris Lilley

See also
Looney (disambiguation)
Lunatic fringe (disambiguation)
Lunacy (disambiguation)
Norman the Lunatic, stage name for American professional Mike Shaw (1957–2010)